The 1942 Troy State Red Wave football team represented Troy State Teachers College (now known as Troy University) as a member of the Alabama Intercollegiate Conference (AIC) during the 1942 college football season. Led by sixth-year head coach Albert Choate, the Red Wave compiled an overall record of 4–3, with a mark of 2–0 in conference play, winning the AIC title.

Schedule

References

Troy State
Troy Trojans football seasons
Troy State Red Wave football